Mohammad Muslim was an Indian politician belonging to Bharatiya Janata Party. He was elected as a member of Uttar Pradesh Legislative Assembly from Tiloi in 1996 and 2012. He died on 29 August 2019.

References

2019 deaths
Members of the Uttar Pradesh Legislative Assembly
Bharatiya Janata Party politicians from Uttar Pradesh
Year of birth missing